Theodore Edwin Gehring Jr. (April 6, 1929 – September 28, 2000) was an American film and television actor. He is known for playing the recurring role as "Charlie" on 16 episodes of the American sitcom television series Alice.

Life and career 
Gehring was born in Bisbee, Arizona. Gehring began his career in 1965, where he first appeared in The Big Valley, playing Larsh. He continued his career, mainly appearing in film and television, often cast as a policeman, bad guy or anonymous roles, over the years.

Later in his career, Gehring guest-starred in numerous television programs including Gunsmoke, Battlestar Galactica (and its spin-off Galactica 1980), M*A*S*H, Star Trek: The Original Series, Get Smart, Bonanza, The Rockford Files, Three's Company, Emergency!, Little House on the Prairie, Quincy, M.E., Daniel Boone, Death Valley Days, Adam-12 and Mission: Impossible. He also appeared in films such as The Best Little Whorehouse in Texas, Nickelodeon, Bound for Glory, The Apple Dumpling Gang Rides Again, When Time Ran Out..., The Legend of the Lone Ranger, The Domino Principle and Rafferty and the Gold Dust Twins. Gehring has also played the role as "Sydney Forbes" in the soap opera television series Days of Our Lives, from 1980.

Gehring also starred and co-starred in other films and television programs, as it includes, The Family Holvak, playing Chester Purdle, The Police Connection, playing the role of "Police Chief Marc C. Forester" and On the Air Live with Captain Midnight, playing Father. His last film appearance, was from the television film Leave Her to Heaven, in 1988. In 1989, Gehring retired his career in film and television, last appearing in the television series 1st & Ten, where he played the recurring role as "Ned Lassiter".

Death 
Gehring died in September 2000 in Steelville, Missouri, at the age of 71.

Filmography

References

External links 
 
 
 
 Rotten Tomatoes profile

1929 births
2000 deaths
People from Bisbee, Arizona
Male actors from Arizona
American male film actors
American male television actors
American soap opera actors
American male soap opera actors
20th-century American male actors
Western (genre) television actors